Emmalocera laminella is a species of snout moth in the genus Emmalocera. It was described by George Hampson in 1901. It is found in South Africa.

References

Endemic moths of South Africa
Moths described in 1901
Emmalocera